Mohammad Amin Fatemi (born 1952 in Nangarhar Province) is an Afghan physician and politician. He has served as an advisor to the World Health Organization in Geneva, Switzerland for Mediterranean countries. He was the Public Health Minister of Afghanistan, appointed during a cabinet reshuffle in 2004, having previously served in the same role from 1993 to 1995. Suraya Dalil became acting Minister in 2010 and Minister of Public Health (MoPH) in 2012.

Fatemi served as the Afghanistan's ambassador to Japan from 2010 to April 20, 2017, when he returned to Afghanistan.

References

External links
 CV at the Ministry of Public Health of Afghanistan

1952 births
Living people
Afghan expatriates in Pakistan
People from Nangarhar Province
Health ministers of Afghanistan
Public health ministers
Ambassadors of Afghanistan to Japan
Boston University School of Public Health alumni
Afghan public health doctors
Nangarhar University alumni